Mississippi Highway 22 (MS 22) is a state highway in central Mississippi, United States.

Route description

MS 22 begins in rural western Hinds County in the town of Edwards at an intersection with MS 467 just north of downtown. It heads north to immediately have an interchange with I-20/US 80 (Exit 19) before leaving Edwards and winding its way northeast as a two-lane highway through a mix of farmland and wooded areas for the next several miles.

The highway now crosses into Madison County and passes by the Mississippi Petrified Forest as it enters Flora along Peach Street to have an intersection with US 49. MS 22 enters neighborhoods and makes a left turn onto Fourth Street, which it follows northward for a few blocks before making a right onto Madison Street. The highway now enters downtown at a signalized intersection with First Street, and passes straight through the center of town along Main Street. MS 22 crosses over a set of railroad tracks before leaving Flora and traveling through rural farmland for several miles, where it passes through the community of Livingston to have a junction with MS 463. The highway travels along the shores of Lake Caroline before entering the Canton city limits and immediately having intersections with Calhoun Parkway and Nissan Parkway. MS 22 becomes W Peace Street as it widens to a four-lane undivided highway and travels through a business district, where it has an interchange with I-55/MS 16 (Exit 119). The highway crosses a bridge over Bear Creek before narrowing to two-lanes at an intersection with W Fulton Street to pass through neighborhoods for several blocks before entering downtown. MS 22 comes to an end shortly thereafter at an intersection with US 51 (N/S Liberty Street) at the center of town.

History

MS 22 was originally designated back in 1950, with being signed into law in 1949.

MS 22 became one of only two state highways in Mississippi (the other being MS 69) to have the same number as an Interstate or U.S. Highway within the state, with the designation of Interstate 22 (I-22) in Mississippi in 2015.

Original MS 22

MS 22 was originally designated in 1932 along a major east west highway across the southern portion of the state, running from the city of Natchez (on the banks of the Mississippi River) to the town of Waynesboro (near the Alabama state line), passing through Meadville-Bude, Brookhaven, Monticello, Prentiss, Collins and Laurel. This designation only survived two years, when in 1934 US 84 was designated along its path.

Major intersections

See also

References

External links

 Magnolia Meanderings

022
Transportation in Hinds County, Mississippi
Transportation in Madison County, Mississippi